Raúl Troncoso Castillo (27 April 1935−28 November 2004) was a Chilean politician and lawyer who served as Minister of the Interior, Minister of Denfense and as Minister General Secretariat of Government.

References

External links
 Profile at Annales de la República

1935 births
2004 deaths
Pontifical Catholic University of Chile alumni
20th-century Chilean politicians
21st-century Chilean politicians
Social Christian Conservative Party politicians
Christian Democratic Party (Chile) politicians